Matt Clare (born May 25, 1988 in Fort Lauderdale, Florida) is an American soccer player who last played for Florida Tropics SC in the Major Arena Soccer League.

Career

Youth and Amateur
Clare, who did not play college soccer, played with elite youth team Charlotte Soccer, before going on to play for IMG ACADEMY.

Professional
Clare signed his first professional contract in 2011 when he signed with FC Tampa Bay of the North American Soccer League, having trialed with the team during pre-season. He made his professional debut on May 11, coming on as a late substitute in a game against FC Edmonton. Tampa Bay announced that the club exercised its 2012 contract option on Clare on October 5, 2011. The new contract also includes a club option for the 2013 season. Clare went on to play for the Wichita Wings in the Major Indoor Soccer League and the Wichita B-52s in the MASL. Clare signed for the San Diego Sockers in 2015 where he won 3 conference championships. Clare signed for National Premier Soccer League club FC Wichita on Feb 23, 2015 leading them to 2 conference championships.  Clare has been a dominant force in the indoor game over the course of 7 years.  Clare represented the United States Arena team over 4 years winning the World Cup in 2015 . Clare traveled to Tunisia to try his luck again but came up short in the quarter finals to Mexico in a heartbreaking loss.

Clare made his return to Florida on 31 January 2019, signing with Florida Tropics SC. Clare has been a dominant force in the indoor game over the course of 7 years.

Personal
Matt is the son of former professional soccer player John Clare, who played for the Fort Lauderdale Strikers in the American Professional Soccer League in the 1990s. Matt's brother Andrew currently plays as a centerback for Tropics SC in the United Premier Soccer League.

References

External links
 Tampa Bay profile

1988 births
Living people
American soccer players
IMG Academy Bradenton players
Tampa Bay Rowdies players
West Virginia Chaos players
USL League Two players
North American Soccer League players
St. Petersburg Kickers players
Association football forwards
Major Arena Soccer League players
National Premier Soccer League players
Major Indoor Soccer League (2008–2014) players
Tacoma Stars (2003–) players
Syracuse Silver Knights players
Wichita Wings (2011–2013 MISL) players
Wichita B-52s
FC Wichita players
San Diego Sockers players
Florida Tropics SC players
United Premier Soccer League players